The Directorate of the Ministry for Internal Affairs in Volgograd Oblast (ГУ МВД России по Волгоградской области) or the Police of Volgograd Oblast (Полиция Волгоградской области) is the main law enforcement agency in the Government of Volgograd Oblast in Russia. It is subordinate to the regional MVD and the Governor of Volgograd Oblast.

The current chief of police in Volgograd Oblast is Aleksander Kravchenko (since 2011).

External links
 Official Website in Russian
Official Channel in YouTube
 Volgograd City Police Department
 Official Website of the Police Department in Volzhsky, Volgograd Oblast

Volgograd Oblast
Law enforcement agencies of Russia